Teresa Mannino (born 23 November 1970) is an Italian comedian, actress, and TV presenter.

Biography
Born in Palermo, Mannino graduated in philosophy, and then she moved to Milan, where she enrolled in the Teatro Carcano European Drama School. 
After several other courses and workshops, she became a stand-up comedian and began appearing in the Canale 5 variety show Zelig. Mannino is active on stage, in films and in many TV commercials. In 2012 she hosted a one-woman-show on La 7, Se stasera sono qui. In an interview, she defined the latter show as a "show talk", rather than a "talk show", meaning that the show would host characters who would hold mini-talks on aspects of society and culture.

References

Further reading

External links 
 

Italian film actresses
Italian television actresses
Italian stage actresses
1970 births
Mass media people from Palermo
Living people
Italian television presenters
Italian women comedians
Actresses from Palermo
Italian women television presenters
University of Palermo alumni